Touchdown is the debut studio album by Swedish boy band JTR. It was released by MGM in Australia on 7 March 2014 immediately following their debut single "Ride", which was released after they finished in seventh place in season 5 of the Australian version of The X Factor. It peaked at number 44 on the ARIA Albums Chart.

After the band's tour in Sweden, the album was released there on 5 November 2014 through Sony Music Entertainment, entering the Swedish Albums Chart at number 52, while peaking at number 25.

Track listing
"Touchdown" – 3:38
"Never" – 2:58
"Ride" – 3:10
"Thinking Bout Ya" – 3:27
"Movie Star" – 3:00
"I'm in Love" – 2:58
"Save It" – 2:45
"I Want What I Can't Have" – 3:45
"Something You Gotta Do" – 2:54
"Before You Go" – 2:46
"Drive On By" – 3:14
"Shut Out the Lies" – 3:39
"Until Then" – 3:20
"Leave with Me" – 3:30

Charts

References

2014 debut albums
JTR (band) albums